Keum may refer to:

Name
Keum (琴), Middle Chinese of string musical instruments, Qin (琴)
Keum (琴), common of Kum (琴)
Keum (琴), common of Kym (surname) the Cantonese of Qin (surname) (琴), Jin (surname) (金)
Keum (琴 or 今), also spelled Geum, the romanization of the rare Korean surname 금.

People
Keum Na-na, (琴) Miss Korea 2002

See also
Qin (disambiguation)
Kum (disambiguation)